Tanus or Tanos was a town of ancient Crete. Tanus minted coins in antiquity, some of which have survived, with the epigraph ΤΑΝΙΩΝ.

The site of Tanus is tentatively located near modern Almyrida/Castel Apicorno.

References

Populated places in ancient Crete
Former populated places in Greece